Bid Korpeh-ye Olya (also Romanized as Bīd Korpeh-ye ‘Olyā; also known as Bidkarih Olya, Bīd Korpeh, and Bīdkorpeh-ye Bālā) is a village in Kamazan-e Sofla Rural District, Zand District, Malayer County, Hamadan Province, Iran. At the 2006 census, its population was 163, in 39 families. The Kakavand family is the most famous people of this village.

References 

Populated places in Malayer County